Aliya Yussupova (Äliia Maqsūtqyzy Jüsıpova; born May 15, 1984) is a retired individual rhythmic gymnast who competed for Kazakhstan, coached by Irina Viner.

Personal life 
Aliya Yussupova is of Kazakh ethnicity.

Career 

Yussupova moved to Moscow, Russia and began training with renowned Russian coach Irina Viner.

She won two silver medals in ball and clubs at the 2004 World Cup Final in Moscow. At the 2004 Athens Olympics she qualified for the finals in 5th. In the finals she was placed fourth with a total of 103.975 (Ribbon 25.550, Clubs 26.325, Ball 26.600, Hoop 25.500).

Yussupova won the Kazakhstani National Championships in the individual all-around competition in 2000–2005.
In 2006 Asian championships in Surat, India, (from July 29 to August 3), she swept the rhythmic gymnastics medals. She won six gold medals, including four individual apparatus titles, the team gold and individual all-around title. She finished 6th in All-around at the 2007 World Championships.

Yussupova competed in her second Olympics at the 2008 Summer Olympics in Beijing, she finished 5th at the All-around event finals. She was the also all around bronze medalist at the 2009 Universiade and in 2009 Asian championships in Nur-Sultan, Kazakhstan, she won all the gold medals again.

Yussupova retired from competition at the end of the 2009 season. In 2013, she started to train fellow Kazakhstan rhythmic gymnast Sabina Ashirbayeva who achieved 18th place at the 2015 World Rhythmic Gymnastics Championships and it is improving under her tutelage.

Coaching career 
Her notable students include Sabina Ashirbayeva.

Achievements 
 First Asian and Kazakh rhythmic gymnast to medal at the World Cup final.
 First Kazakh gymnast to place in top 10 Finals in the Olympic Games (2004 and 2008).

Detailed Olympic results

References

External links
 
 
 

1984 births
Living people
People from Shymkent
Kazakhstani rhythmic gymnasts
Olympic gymnasts of Kazakhstan
Gymnasts at the 2004 Summer Olympics
Gymnasts at the 2008 Summer Olympics
Asian Games medalists in gymnastics
Asian Games gold medalists for Kazakhstan
Asian Games silver medalists for Kazakhstan
Gymnasts at the 2002 Asian Games
Gymnasts at the 2006 Asian Games
Medalists at the 2002 Asian Games
Medalists at the 2006 Asian Games
World Games silver medalists
Competitors at the 2005 World Games
Universiade medalists in gymnastics
Universiade bronze medalists for Kazakhstan
Competitors at the 2007 Summer Universiade
Medalists at the 2005 Summer Universiade
Medalists at the 2009 Summer Universiade